Inspiration is a 1949 Czechoslovakian animated short film directed by Karel Zeman. It is a wordless stop-motion film made using glass figurines. The characters in the film are stock characters from Italian commedia dell'arte.

Plot synopsis
An unnamed man, implied to be an artist, is looking at a drop of water by his window. In it, he sees the clown Pierrot being spurned by his beloved Columbine, who is riding in a horse-drawn carriage.

References

1949 films
1949 animated films
1949 short films
Czechoslovak short films
1940s stop-motion animated films
1940s animated short films
Czechoslovak animated short films
Films directed by Karel Zeman
Czech animated short films
Films about clowns
Films with screenplays by Karel Zeman
Commedia dell'arte
1940s Czech-language films
1940s Czech films